Astrid Chan (born 8 July 1969 in Hong Kong) is a Hong Kong actress and host.

Career
Chan was a Miss Hong Kong 1994 finalist. She acted for TVB first in the late 1990s, then switched to ATV in the early 2000s then switched back to TVB. Her notable roles were in Forensic Heroes (2006) and Marriage of Inconvenience (2007).

Filmography
 That Demon Within (2014)

TVB Series

ATV Series

Personal 
In 2003, Astrid married Adonis Kam Wing Cheung in the United Kingdom while pregnant with daughter, Antonia Cheung (張珈瑋).

References

External links
Official Main Site at TVB
Official Blog at TVB
Profile page at Hong Kong Performing Artistes Guild

TVB veteran actors
1969 births
Living people
Hong Kong people of Taiwanese descent
Hong Kong television actresses
Hong Kong television presenters
Hong Kong women television presenters
20th-century Hong Kong actresses
21st-century Hong Kong actresses